Lenn Jastremski (born 24 January 2001) is a German professional footballer who plays as a centre-forward or right winger for 2. Liga club Grazer AK, on loan from Bayern Munich II.

Career statistics

References

2001 births
People from Salzgitter
Footballers from Lower Saxony
Living people
German footballers
Germany youth international footballers
Association football forwards
Association football wingers
VfL Wolfsburg II players
FC Bayern Munich II players
FC Viktoria Köln players
FC Erzgebirge Aue players
Grazer AK players
Regionalliga players
3. Liga players
German expatriate footballers
Expatriate footballers in Austria
German expatriate sportspeople in Austria